Speedwell is an area of east Bristol, Part of the  ward. It has a mixture of residential and industrial land.

The 2014 population estimate of the population of Speedwell was 2,342.

The one School in the area is Bristol Brunel Academy, previously known as Speedwell Technology College and Speedwell Secondary School. It was Bristol's first specialist school - a technology college since 1997. In 2007 the Academy moved into all-new purpose built buildings and the old school buildings were demolished.

History
The Speedwell area had many small coal mines in the 19th century.  In the 1970s some of these old workings had to be stabilised in the area of Speedwell secondary school.  A goods only railway connected the collieries and the Peckett and Sons locomotive works (also known as the Atlas Locomotive Works) with the Midland railway at Kingswood junction.  In the early 1970s, shortly after Avon county council was formed, approximately half of Speedwell secondary school burnt down, the school was partly rebuilt.  A number of 'temporary' prefab houses, built in the housing shortage after the World War II, existed in the west side of the suburb into the 21st century.

References

Areas of Bristol